Cocky & Confident is the eighth studio album by American rapper Juvenile. The album was released on December 1, 2009, by Atlantic Records, UTP Records and E1 Entertainment. The album is the rapper's follow up to his album Reality Check, which landed at #1 on Billboard's Top 200 chart when the album was released in March 2006. It features artists such as B.G., Dorrough, Kango Slim, Q Corvette, Rico Love and Pleasure P and others making guest appearances. Producers on the album include Mouse, Precise, FATBOI, Lu Balz, S-8ighty & more. It is the first album in which Juvenile himself produces. The album debuted at #49 on the Billboard 200 with 23,000 copies sold in its first week.

Singles 
The first promo single is "Hands On You", featuring Pleasure P and produced by Lu Balz. It was released on iTunes on September 8, 2009. The first single is "Gotta Get It", which is produced by Precise. It was released on iTunes a week after "Hands On You" on September 15, 2009. The second single is "We Be Getting Money", featuring Shawty Lo, Dorrough, & Kango Slim and produced by S-8ighty. It was released on iTunes on October 27, 2009.

Track listing

Charts

References

External links 
 

2009 albums
Juvenile (rapper) albums
Albums produced by Fatboi
Atlantic Records albums